The Okaloosa darter (Etheostoma okaloosae) is a species of freshwater ray-finned fish, a darter from the subfamily Etheostomatinae, part of the family Percidae, which also contains the perches, ruffes and pikeperches. It is indigenous to freshwater streams and tributary systems in Okaloosa and Walton Counties in northwest Florida.

Description
It is a silvery brownish-green in color with irregular dark mottling and longitudinal lines of tiny dark spots.

Distribution and habitat
The Okaloosa darter is restricted to six small river systems draining into the Choctawhatchee Bay drainage system in Okaloosa and Walton counties in the panhandle of Florida. Ninety percent of its range is within the Eglin Air Force Base. It is found in shallow clear creeks among vegetation over sandy bottoms. Eggs are deposited on the bed of the creek and are not guarded by an adult fish as happens in some members of this family.

Status
Because of extensive habitat improvement and efforts by the Jackson Guard at Eglin Air Force Base, the US Fish and Wildlife Service downlisted the species from endangered to threatened status in 2011. The IUCN has classified this species as being "Least concern".

All known habitats of the fish (tributaries of Rocky, Toms, and Boggy Bayou) are presently being affected by commercial development and/or road construction.

References

Collette, B.B., and R.W. Yerger. 1962. The American Percid Fishes of the Subgenus Villora. Tulane Stud. Zool. 9:213-230.

Jelks, H.L., and F. Jordan.  2010.  Okaloosa darter research at Eglin Air Force Base.

Mettee, M.F., and E. Crittenden. 1979. A study of Etheostoma okaloosae (Fowler) and E. edwini (Hubbs and Cannon) in Northwestern Florida, 1975-78. Rep. to U.S. Fish and Wild. Serv., Atlanta, GA.

Ogilvie, V.E. 1980. Endangered Wildlife Project. E-1, Study I-J: Okaloosa darter investigation. Completion report, October 1, 1977-June 3O, 1980. Fla. Fresh Water Fish Comm., Tallahassee.

U.S. Fish and Wildlife Service. 1981. Recovery Plan for the Okaloosa Darter (Etheostoma okaloosae). Prepared by the Okaloosa Darter Recovery Team for U.S. Fish and Wildlife Service, Atlanta Georgia. 24 pp.

Yerger, R.W. 1978. Okaloosa Darter, pp. 2–4. In C.R. Gilbert (ed.). Rare and endangered biota of Florida. Vol. 4, Fishes. Univ. Press. Fla., Gainesville.''

Etheostoma
Endemic fauna of Florida
Fish described in 1941
ESA threatened species